Giovanni Oliva (short Gianni, born in Turin) is an Italian historian and politician.

Oliva specialises in Italian modern history, and in particular subjects related to the history of Italy during World War II.

He has written books about the Italian resistance movement, Italian war crimes, German and fascist war crimes in Italy during the 1943-1945 period, the Italian Social Republic, the 1945 anti-fascist epuration, the foibe massacres and the Istrian–Dalmatian exodus.

Oliva has also been active in politics, and has held several public offices, first as a member of the Italian Communist Party, then of the Democratic Party of the Left.

Author

1989 La Resistenza alle porte di Torino
1994 I vinti e i liberati, Mondadori, Milano
1996 I 600 giorni di Salò, Giunti
1997 La Repubblica di Salò, Giunti
1998 I Savoia, Mondadori, Milano
1999 La resa dei conti, Mondadori, Milano
2000 Umberto II, Mondadori, Milano
2001 Storia degli Alpini, Mondadori, Milano
2002 Foibe, Le stragi negate degli italiani della Venezia Giulia e dell'Istria, Mondadori, Milano
2002 Storia dei Carabinieri, Mondadori, Milano
2003 Duchi d'Aosta, Mondadori, Milano
2003 La Resistenza, Giunti
2004 Le tre italie del 1943, Mondadori, Milano
2005 Profughi, Mondadori, Milano
2006 «Si ammazza troppo poco». I crimini di guerra italiani (Italian war crimes) 1940-43, Mondadori, Milano
2007 L'ombra nera- le stragi nazifasciste che non ricordiamo più, Mondadori, Milano
2009 Soldati e Ufficiali - L'esercito italiano dal Risorgimento a oggi, Mondadori, Milano
2011 Esuli. Dalle foibe ai campi profughi: la tragedia degli italiani di Istria, Fiume, Dalmazia, Mondadori
2011 Primavera 1945. Il sangue della guerra civile, Giunti
2012 Un regno che è stato grande. La storia negata dei Borboni di Napoli e Sicilia, Mondadori, Milano

See also
Foibe massacres

References

1952 births
Living people
20th-century Italian historians
21st-century Italian historians
Writers from Turin